Seoraksan is the highest mountain in the Taebaek mountain range in the Gangwon Province in eastern South Korea. It is located in a national park near the city of Sokcho. After the Hallasan volcano on Jeju Island and Jirisan in the south, Seoraksan is the third highest mountain in South Korea. The Daechongbong Peak (대청봉) of Seoraksan reaches 1,708 meters (5,603 feet). The mountain is sometimes considered the backbone of South Korea.

Geography 
Seoraksan is divided into Naeseorak (Inner Seorak), Oaeseorak (Outer Seorak), and Namseorak (South Seorak).

Naeseorak (Inner Seorak) 
The area belonging to Inje-gun in the northwest and Daecheongbong Peak is called Naeseolak,

Naeseorak features various valley views including Baekdam Valley, Gaya-dong Valley, Gugokdam Valley, Gugokdam Valley, 12 Seonnyeondang, Daeseung Falls and Yongajangseong Fortress. In addition to Cheonbul-dong Valley, it is easy to access Ulsan Rock, Gwongeumseong Fortress, Geumgang Cave, Biryong Falls, and Toseong Falls.

Oaeseorak (Outer Seorak) 
Oaeseorak is the area belonging to Sokcho City towards the east. It features easier hiking courses and is one of the most accessed areas of the park.

Mountain geography, fauna and flora 
It was designated as Natural Monument No.171 in 1965, and as a national park on Mount Seorak on March 24, 1970. In August 1982, UNESCO designated the area as a biosphere reserve.

Depending on the climate and characteristics, the mountain's biologic features have different ecosystems. While the inland climate is composed of gentle slopes and thick layers of soil, the forest is abundant and animal form is abundant, the outcropping is a marine climate, which causes the ground to steep and frequent visitors, which is less formal. Rare plants and animals live in the wild, including natural monuments such as mountain goats and semi-moon chest bears.

The biosphere of the Mt. Seolak is composed of different ecosystems according to climate and characteristics. It is an inland climate with gentle slopes and thick soil layers that are rich in forests and rich in animal habitats, while oyster shells have a marine climate with steep slopes and few visitors. It is home to rare animals and plants, including natural monuments such as goats and bears.

Hiking Paths

Outer Seorak District 

The Yukdam waterfall and the Biryeong waterfall (비룡폭포) are located on the left side of the valley, about a forty-minute walk from the main car park. Ulsanbawi (울산바위) is a rock formation in the Seoraksan national park. The shape of Ulsanbawi is unique in the area. To reach the rocks you need to follow a hiking path and climb over 800 steps (it is actually 888 steps according to locals). On the way there, there are two temples and a spherical rock (Heundeulbawi, 흔들바위) which is located on top of a larger rock. This rock is about 5 meters (16 feet) high and can be moved with some effort. Thousands of people have already tried to push down Heundeulbawi, but nobody gets further than waggling the rock.

Legend of Ulsanbawi 

According to the legend Ulsanbawi comes from the city of Ulsan in the south east of Korea. As Kumgangsan (금강산) was built, Ulsanbawi walked to the north as the representative of the city. Unfortunately Ulsanbawi arrived too late and there was no more room. Ulsanbawi was ashamed and slowly trudged back to the south. One evening the rock went to sleep in the Seorak area. Ulsanbawi felt it was so beautiful around there that it decided to stay for good.

At the end of the main valley is Biseondae, a rock platform in a stream. Above the stream is a difficult to reach cave, which offers clear views of the surrounding rock formations.

A bit farther from the entrance is the Valley of a Thousand Buddhas (천불동계곡), the primary valley of Seorak Mountain, also sometimes referred to as Seorak Valley. The valley was so named because the rock formations that line its sides resemble a line-up of Buddha statues.

Dinosaur Ridge 

The Dinosaur Ridge (공룡능선) is the ridge in Seoraksan that extends from Mardeungyeong to Sinseonam. It is one of Korea's cultural scenic treasures, being designated as the 103rd treasure in 2013. It earns it name due to the mountain peaks in the ridge looking like the back of a spiked dinosaur.
The course is very strenuous, with steep peaks that require a 16+ hour hike to go through the course. It is listed among the most difficult mountain courses to climb in Korea.
Due to this, accidents due to exhaustion are very common, especially in winter. One incident in December 1993 left 2 university students dead due to them losing their way at night and experiencing hypothermia.

Gallery

See also 
 List of mountains in Korea
 Geography of South Korea

References

External links 

 
 Seoraksan National park

 
Mountains of Gangwon Province, South Korea
Mountains of South Korea
Inje County
Sokcho
Yangyang County
Taebaek Mountains
Biosphere reserves of South Korea